, known by his pseudonym ZUN, is a Japanese composer and video game developer best known for developing and self-publishing the Touhou Project video game series through the dojin group Team Shanghai Alice, of which he is the only member. In 2010, the Guinness World Records called the Touhou Project "the most prolific fan-based shooter series" ever created. ZUN is also known as the Hakurei Kannushi (博麗神主), which is also the name he uses for his Twitter account.

Early life 
ZUN was born in Hakuba on March 18, 1977, and described himself as a "normal countryside kid." His first exposure to video games was in 1982-1983, when he played the Game & Watch and arcade games from Hakuba ski resorts. Later, his parents bought him a Famicom Disk System (an add-on for the Nintendo Entertainment System exclusive to Japan). ZUN claimed that SonSon, Super Mario Bros. and Street Fighter II were the games that left the greatest impression on him during this period. As ZUN was born shortly after his grandfather's death and his parents spent most their time working, ZUN was mostly raised by his grandmother, who was particularly strict, and heavily regulated the time he could spend playing video games.

ZUN's first interest in developing video games came during his high school years. While most shoot 'em up games utilise a military or science fiction theme, ZUN wanted a game with a miko main character and a Shinto aesthetic. ZUN was part of his school's orchestra club, and originally wanted to create music for video games. As he did not know anybody else who was making games that he could put his music in, he made his own games for this purpose. Around 2001, he applied to Comiket as a music group under the name of Shanghai Alice Ensemble, but was rejected.

In 2012, ZUN married a mobile game programmer, whom he has a son and daughter with.

ZUN likes to drink beer, and has said that he drinks at least once a day. He has created his own beer (sometimes called Touhou beer), and written reviews for beers in Comptiq. His favourite brand is Kirin.

Career 
ZUN attended Tokyo Denki University, where he majored in mathematics, and it was during university that he created the first Touhou game, Highly Responsive to Prayers. The first five Touhou games were developed for the PC-9800 series of computers, of which ZUN owned the PC-9821 model. While ZUN did make a few games before this, the first one being a copy of Puyo Puyo, these were never published, and are assumed to be lost.

After university, ZUN worked as a programmer at Taito from 1998-2007. He got the position by showing his interviewer the Touhou games he had created, after which, he was hired immediately. During his career at Taito, ZUN helped work on Greatest Striker, Magic Pengel: The Quest for Color, Bujingai, Graffiti Kingdom and Exit, as well as some other games that were ultimately cancelled. He left as he did not enjoy working at the company, and Touhou was already successful enough for him to make a living from it. However, he did not initially plan for Touhou to become his life work.

While the Touhou games were initially created as a passion project, ZUN found that they were very successful – the first games he sold were Highly Responsive to Prayers and its sequel, The Story of Eastern Wonderland, at the 1997 Comiket. He brought a combined total of 80 copies, and was surprised when he was able to sell all of them. Touhou games were sold through Comiket until 2004, when the convention Reitaisai was founded. The same year, ZUN wrote Curiosities of Lotus Asia, short stories that appeared in various magazines, which were then put together in a 2010 anthology. This was the first of several pieces of in-universe Touhou literature. Silent Sinner in Blue, the first official Touhou manga, was published in 2007. Literature continues to be produced, with the latest being the on-going Cheating Detective Satori and Lotus Eaters.

Design philosophy 
ZUN has voiced criticism of the video game industry, saying that games have become easier and less mechanically complex when they try to appeal to a wider audience. However, he noted that the dojin game market has allowed for danmaku and other niche genres to still thrive.

ZUN works alone, and each Touhou game was created from the ground up, including the engine. The only exception to this are the fighting games, the first of which was Immaterial and Missing Power, created in 2003 with dojin group Twilight Frontier. In the game's afterword, ZUN mentioned that he disliked having to manage other workers, and that he produced things "six times more comfortably" when doing so alone.

ZUN has acknowledged that while the Touhou characters have elaborate stories, little detail is given to them in-game, saying that "danmaku is how the story and characters are communicated." Additionally, he has claimed danmaku is meant to be beautiful and aesthetically pleasing, which is also the main reason why the majority of Touhou characters are female. ZUN believes there is a feminine charm to danmaku, which would be lost with male characters, and that the presence of female characters should not be interpreted as fan service.

References

External links
ZUN's blog 

1977 births
Japanese video game designers
Japanese video game directors
Japanese video game programmers
Living people
People from Nagano (city)
Touhou Project
Video game composers
Video game developers
Taito people
Mythopoeic writers